Morten Tyldum (born 19 May 1967) is a Norwegian film director. He is best known in his native Norway for directing the thriller film Headhunters (2011), based on the novel by Jo Nesbø, and internationally for directing the historical drama The Imitation Game (2014), for which he was nominated for the Academy Award for Best Director, and the science fiction drama Passengers (2016).

Early life
Tyldum was born in Bergen, Norway. He was educated at the School of Visual Arts in New York. He originally wanted to be a musician, but abandoned the ambition when he entered film school.

Career
He had his feature film debut with Buddy in 2003, a film that won great popular and critical acclaim. Previously he had worked in television, music videos, commercials and short films. He had been named Film Talent of the Year by the newspaper Dagbladet in 1999.

Since Buddy, he has made the movie Fallen Angels in 2008 and Headhunters (Hodejegerne) in 2011. Headhunters is based on the 2008 novel by same name written by Jo Nesbø. It became the highest-grossing Norwegian film that year.

He made his English language debut with the historical drama The Imitation Game, about the life of mathematician Alan Turing, starring Benedict Cumberbatch. The Imitation Game immediately became an international success, and was nominated for eight Oscars at the 87th Academy Awards, including Best Picture and a Best Director nomination for Tyldum himself.

Personal life
Tyldum lived in Beverly Hills with his wife Janne and their child. They also maintained a house in Norway. After he divorced his wife and her death by suicide, he moved back to Oslo, Norway, with his son.

Filmography
Film
 Buddy (2003)
 Fallen Angels (2008)
 Headhunters (2011)
 The Imitation Game (2014)
 Passengers (2016)
 Pattern Recognition (TBA)

Short film

Television

Awards and nominations

References

External links

1967 births
Living people
Norwegian film directors
School of Visual Arts alumni
Norwegian expatriates in the United States